Fairfield (originally known as Fairfield Park) is a village and civil parish located in the Central Bedfordshire district of Bedfordshire, England.

History
The village was established in the early 2000s in the buildings and grounds of Fairfield Hospital, a defunct psychiatric hospital which closed in 1999. Today the village consists of some 900 Victorian inspired dwellings of different housing types and about 100 apartments in the former hospital building.

Fairfield was originally intended to become a new village in its own right, although for the first few years it remained within the civil parish of Stotfold. However, on 1 April 2013 Fairfield became a separate civil parish, and elected its own parish council in May 2013.

Governance
Fairfield Parish council is the local parish council for the village, with seven members elected every four years.

The village is within the 'Stotfold and Langford' ward for elections to Central Bedfordshire Council, with three councillors elected every four years.

Fairfield is located within the North East Bedfordshire parliamentary constituency. The elected member is Richard Fuller of the Conservative Party.

Amenities
Amenities in the village include a community centre, Fairfield Bowls Club, Fairfield Park Lower School, a cricket club, a Bannatyne's health club, The Orchard restaurant, children's parks, a hair salon, a nursery school, a Garden House Hospice Care Charity Shop and a small Tesco Express.

Major construction work is now occurring to form more housing on the East side of Hitchin Road. There will be a new school building, however at this stage there are no known plans for any other amenities.

References

External links 
Fairfield Parish Council website
Fairfield Park Lower School website

Villages in Bedfordshire
Populated places established in the 2000s
Civil parishes in Bedfordshire
Central Bedfordshire District